Guimarotodon is an extinct mammal of the Upper Jurassic.  It was a relatively early member of the also extinct order of Multituberculata.  It made its living nibbling plants as great big, and small, dinosaurs roamed the world. (For the technically minded, suborder Plagiaulacida, family Paulchoffatiidae.)

Guimarotodon ("Guimarota tooth") Hahn G, 1969. "Guimarotodon Hahn 1969 exhibits a more slender Corpus mandibulae than either Paulchoffatia or Meketibolodon. The most conspicuous character of this genus is the morphology of the P3-4 and the M1.".  The Corpus mandibulae is the part of the jaw below the tooth row.  P3-4 are upper premolars, whilst M1 is an upper molar tooth.

"The incisor is relatively little curved and its root is of similar length as that of Meketibolodon and extends to underneath the posterior premolars." (Both quotations from Hahn & Hahn 2000, p. 105-106).

Guimarotodon leiriensis 
Guimarotodon leiriensis is found in Kimmeridgian (Upper Jurassic) of Guimarota, Portugal. Classification is based on three lower jaws. The species name refers to the local town of Leiria.

References
 Hahn (1969), Beiträge zur Fauna der Grube Guimarota Nr. 3. Die Multituberculata. Paleontographica, A, 133, p. 1-100. (Contributions on the fauna of the Guimarota mine no. 3.  The Multituberculates.)
 Hahn G & Hahn R (2000), Multituberculates from the Guimarota mine, p. 97-107 in Martin T & Krebs B (eds), Guimarota - A Jurassic Ecosystem, Verlag Dr Friedrich Pfeil, München.
 Kielan-Jaworowska Z & Hurum JH (2001), "Phylogeny and Systematics of multituberculate mammals". Paleontology 44, p. 389-429.
 Much of this information has been derived from  MESOZOIC MAMMALS; Basal Multituberculata, an internet directory.

Multituberculates
Late Jurassic mammals of Europe
Prehistoric mammal genera
Fossil taxa described in 1969